The 1998 Copa Libertadores Final was a two-legged football match-up to determine the 1998 Copa Libertadores champion. It was contested by Brazilian club Vasco da Gama and Ecuadorian club Barcelona. The first leg was played on August 12 at Estádio São Januário in Rio de Janeiro, with the second leg played on August 26 at Estadio Monumental in Guayaquil.

Qualified teams

Route to the finals

Matches

First leg

Second leg

External links
CONMEBOL's official website

1
Copa Libertadores Finals
Copa Libertadores Final 1998
Copa Libertadores Final 1998